Haji Abdul Malik Kakar is a Pakistani politician who was a Member of the Provincial Assembly of Balochistan, from May 2013 to May 2018.

Early life 
He was born on 6 July 1954 in Pishin District.

Political career

He was elected to the Provincial Assembly of Balochistan as a candidate of Jamiat Ulema-e Islam (F) from Constituency PB-9-Pishin-II in 2013 Pakistani general election. He received 15,818 votes and defeated an independent candidate, Asfand Yar Kakar.

References

Living people
Balochistan MPAs 2013–2018
1954 births
Jamiat Ulema-e-Islam (F) politicians